Peter Koech (born February 18, 1958) is a former long-distance runner from Kenya who won a silver medal in the 3,000 meters steeplechase event at the 1988 Summer Olympics. He held the world record in this event for over three years, running 8:05.35 in 1989.  It was the first electronically timed world record for the event and is still in the top 25 performers in history.

He is from Arwos, Nandi District. He now lives in Albuquerque, New Mexico with his wife and three children.  He continued to run in the Masters division, winning the Boilermaker Road Race in 1998.

Achievements

References

External links

1958 births
Living people
Kenyan male middle-distance runners
Kenyan male steeplechase runners
Athletes (track and field) at the 1988 Summer Olympics
Olympic athletes of Kenya
Athletes (track and field) at the 1982 Commonwealth Games
Commonwealth Games medallists in athletics
People from Nandi County
Medalists at the 1988 Summer Olympics
Olympic silver medalists for Kenya
Olympic silver medalists in athletics (track and field)
Commonwealth Games bronze medallists for Kenya
African Games bronze medalists for Kenya
African Games medalists in athletics (track and field)
Kenyan male cross country runners
Athletes (track and field) at the 1987 All-Africa Games
Medallists at the 1982 Commonwealth Games